Gorm may refer to:

Computing
 Gorm (computing), a rapid application development tool
 GORM, the "fantastic ORM library" for the Go programming language
 Grails Object-Relational Mapping, see

People
 Gorm the Old (died 958), Danish king
 Gorm Jensen (1886–1968), Danish Olympic gymnast
 Prince Gorm of Denmark (1919–1991), grandson of King Frederik VIII
 Gorm Henrik Rasmussen (born 1955), Danish poet
 Gorm Kjernli (born 1981), Norwegian politician

Other uses
 Danish ironclad Gorm, a monitor built for the Royal Danish Navy in the 1860s
 Gorm Gulthyn, a god in Dungeons & Dragons
 House of Gorm, a Danish ruling family
 Sail Gorm, a mountain range in Sutherland, Scotland
 Island of Gorm, a fictional place from the children's toy 'Gormiti'
 , the Irish and Scottish Gaelic word for "blue"; see 
 Gorm, a range of storage furniture sold by Swedish outlet IKEA